It's Alright, It's OK may refer to:

 "It's Alright, It's OK" (Ashley Tisdale song), 2009
 "It's Alright, It's OK" (Primal Scream song), 2013
 "It's Alright, It's OK", a song by Shirley Caesar and Anthony Hamilton from the 2016 album Fill This House

See also
 It's Alright (disambiguation)
 It's OK (disambiguation)